Baharestan Metro Station is a station in Tehran Metro Line 2. It is located in Baharestan Square near Majlis of Iran.And Next to a beautiful Park. It is between Darvaze Shemiran Metro Station and Mellat Metro Station.

References

Tehran Metro stations
Railway stations opened in 2003